Mathieu van der Poel (born 19 January 1995) is a Dutch cyclist who rides for the UCI WorldTeam . He competes in the cyclo-cross, mountain bike racing, gravel cycling, and road bicycle racing disciplines of the sport and is best known for winning the Cyclo-cross World Championships in Tábor in 2015, Bogense in 2019, Dübendorf in 2020, Ostend in 2021 and Hoogerheide in 2023, the Junior Road Race World Championships in Florence in 2013, and twice winning the Junior Cyclo-cross World Championships, in Koksijde in 2012 and Louisville in 2013; the first rider to win multiple titles at that level. As well as this, Van der Poel was the winner of the 2018 Dutch National Road Race Championships in Hoogerheide, as well as the 2019 editions of Dwars door Vlaanderen, the Brabantse Pijl, and the Amstel Gold Race.

Born in Kapellen, van der Poel comes from a family of professional cyclists; his brother David is also prominent in cyclo-cross racing, winning the 2013 National Under-23 Championships in Hilvarenbeek. His father, Adri, is a former six-time Dutch National Champion and the World Cyclo-cross Champion for 1996; he was also twice a stage winner at the Tour de France and a winner of several Classics during his career. His maternal grandfather was French cyclist Raymond Poulidor, winner of the 1964 Vuelta a España, who also finished the Tour de France in runner-up position three times and in third place five times.

Career

Junior career

Dominance in cyclo-cross and first road race wins
Van der Poel made his debut in cyclo-cross during the 2009–10 season, competing in the novices ranks. He won several local races, and at the National Championships in Heerlen, Van der Poel finished in second place, fifteen seconds behind the champion Erik Kramer. During the 2010–11 season, Van der Poel won most of the races that he contested; he also combined this with racing on the road in the summer of 2011, and ultimately won the Dutch Novice Time Trial Championships in Zwartemeer. The following winter, Van der Poel advanced to the junior ranks, and was even more dominant than the previous season; out of all the races he contested, he failed to finish first on only four occasions. He also claimed the junior titles at National, European, and World Championship level, each one by a convincing margin.

During the 2012 road season, Van der Poel achieved his first general classification victory at the Ronde des Vallées; he also won the young rider classification at the same race. Van der Poel was also a member of the Dutch World Championship squad, when he competed in the junior road race; he finished within the 56-rider main group, and finished as the best-placed Dutch rider, in ninth position. Picking up where he left off the previous winter, Van der Poel's 2012–13 cyclo-cross campaign was flawless; he contested thirty races, and won every single one of them. Having defended his European title in the United Kingdom, Van der Poel maintained his Dutch title in Hilvarenbeek on the same day that his brother David won the Under-23 Championships.

World champion in cyclo-cross and on the road

The month after winning his Dutch title, Van der Poel became the first cyclist to defend his junior world title, by winning the race in Louisville, Kentucky, ahead of teammate Martijn Budding. In the 2013 road season, Van der Poel contested several Nations' Cup Juniors events for the Dutch national team. At the Course de la Paix, Van der Poel won the opening stage in a six-rider select group; he held the race lead into the following day, where Mads Pedersen assumed the race lead for the remainder of the race in an individual time trial around Třebenice. Van der Poel ultimately finished the race in third place, behind Pedersen and Logan Owen. His next appearance came at the Grand Prix Général Patton, where he soloed – from  remaining – to a six-second victory on the race's second and final stage in Wincrange, en route to finishing second place overall, five seconds adrift of race-winner Christoffer Lisson of Denmark. In the process, he also won the points and mountains sub-classifications.

Van der Poel booked stage victories at the Ain'Ternational–Rhône Alpes–Valromey Tour; riding for Enerthem-BKCP, he won a five-rider sprint on the opener, and defeated France's Élie Gesbert in a head-to-head finish on the final stage, to take the overall race victory by almost half a minute from Gesbert. Prior to his next Nations Cup appearance, Van der Poel won the Dutch National Junior Road Race Championships in Chaam. At the Trophée Centre Morbihan, Van der Poel won the race overall, having defended the race lead from the start, after winning a head-to-head sprint against Belarus' Aleksandr Riabushenko on the opening stage. In the lead up to the World Championships, Van der Poel dominated the Grand Prix Rüebliland event, as he won the opening three of the race's four stages. He won a three-rider sprint in Bettwil to win the opening stage, before a solo victory the following day in Leutwil, and a victory in a  individual time trial in Hunzenschwil. Pedersen got the better of Van der Poel in a bunch sprint on the final stage, but Van der Poel had done enough to win the race overall by 46 seconds over Pedersen.

This form made Van der Poel one of the favourites for the World Championships, where he would lead the Dutch squad. In addition to competing in the road race, Van der Poel contested the junior time trial race for the Netherlands, along with Sam Oomen. Van der Poel finished 50th out of the 84 riders to complete the course, over two minutes down on the eventual world champion Igor Decraene of Belgium.

Senior career

Van der Poel moved into the under-23 category ahead of the 2013–14 cyclo-cross season. In his first race in the class, Van der Poel won the GP Mario De Clercq – in the BPost Bank Trophy – at Ronse, defeating nearest rival Gianni Vermeersch by twelve seconds. After he finished third in his first World Cup race, Van der Poel won the second round of the season at Tábor in the Czech Republic, beating Vermeersch once again by three seconds. In the process, Van der Poel became the first rider since Niels Albert in 2004 to take an under-23 race victory as a first-year rider. He completed a clean sweep of victories in the major cyclo-cross competitions, by winning at Ruddervoorde in the Superprestige the following day, leading home his rivals by almost a minute. He won a silver medal at the UEC European Cyclo-cross Championships in Mladá Boleslav in the Czech Republic, finishing 23 seconds behind winner Michael Vanthourenhout.

Van der Poel turned professional with the  team at the start of the 2014 season, joining brother David at the squad, having signed a four-year contract. Prior to doing so, Van der Poel made his elite debut in the Scheldecross Antwerpen, in December 2013; Van der Poel was competing alongside professionals as there was no under-23 race. He finished second in the race, five seconds behind his future teammate Niels Albert, having dropped Philipp Walsleben and Rob Peeters in the closing stages. He again finished second to Albert ten days later in the Grand Prix De Ster Sint-Niklaas, losing out in a two-man sprint finish. He ended 2013 with his fourth Superprestige victory of the season at Diegem.

After finishing second to Wout van Aert in his opening race of 2014 at the Grand Prix Sven Nys, Van der Poel secured the overall under-23 World Cup title with his fourth win of the season, at the Memorial Romano Scotti in Rome. He achieved his first professional victory at the Boels Classic Internationale Cyclo-cross in Heerlen, beating closest rivals Thijs van Amerongen and Rob Peeters. In his first senior road race, Van der Poel finished seventh in the Omloop der Kempen, which had finished in a sprint to the line in Veldhoven. Just a few weeks later he secured his first professional victory on the road, winning the Ronde van Limburg.

More recently he has begun to compete in the cross-country cycling discipline of the sport setting his sights on the Tokyo 2020 Olympic Games. In 2017 he placed 2nd in the World Cup at Albstadt behind world champion Nino Schurter. In 2018 he raced a full World Cup season finishing 2nd in the series overall and 3rd at the World Championships in Lenzerheide, as well as winning the Dutch National Championship. At the 2018 European Cycling Championships in Glasgow, Van der Poel competed in the cross-country mountain bike and the road race, winning a silver medal in the latter.

2021

In 2021, Van der Poel competed in his first grand tour, the 2021 Tour de France. Here he succeeded in winning the second stage and acquired the yellow jersey, which he would wear for six days. He also secured the King of the Mountain jersey on that stage, which he held for a single day.

Van der Poel participated in the Mountain Biking event at the 2020 Summer Olympics in Tokyo. The event featured seven laps, but he crashed on a descent in the first lap, as he forgot that a ramp had been removed. He managed to continue racing, but eventually pulled out after the sixth lap, unable to make up lost time.

Due to persistent back problems, worsened by his Olympic crash, Van der Poel did not defend his title at the 2021 Tour of Britain. He did go on to win the 2021 edition of the Antwerp Port Epic, which he used as a trial run for the UCI World Championships.

He came eighth at the 2021 UCI Road World Championships and finished his road season in the 2021 Paris–Roubaix where he took the final podium place covered head to toe in mud. He put an initial hold on his cyclocross season due to his continued back pain, and eventually raced twice before pulling out altogether. At his first race, the Dendermonde World Cup, he finished second behind Wout van Aert. In his second and final race of the season, he crashed early on and pulled out after seven laps.

In September 2021, he has renewed his contract with Alpecin–Fenix until 2025.

2022
After three months of rest due to his back pain, Van der Poel began his 2022 season at Milan–San Remo, where he finished in third. He followed this up with racing in Settimana Internazionale di Coppi e Bartali, a five day stage race, where he took home a win on the fourth stage. He won his next two races the Dwars door Vlaanderen and Ronde van Vlaanderen, both of which he had previously won.

After a fourth in Amstel Gold Race and a ninth in Paris–Roubaix, Van der Poel made his first appearance at the Giro d'Italia, the second Grand Tour participation of his career. He won the opening stage and wore the pink leader's jersey for three stages. He also won the overall Combativity Award. 

In September, Van der Poel was convicted of common assault against two girls aged 13 and 14, after an incident in a hotel in Sydney the night before the Road World Championship; the conviction was overturned following appeal in December.

2023 
Van der Poel began his 2023 season with a win at the X20 Trofee Herentals cyclocross race. He followed this up with two further wins and two silver medals before taking part in the UCI Cyclo-cross World Championships, which he won for a fifth time after a tight sprint against Wout van Aert.

Major results

References

External links

 
 

1995 births
Cross-country mountain bikers
Cyclists at the 2020 Summer Olympics
Cyclo-cross cyclists
Dutch Giro d'Italia stage winners
Dutch Tour de France stage winners
Dutch male cyclists
Dutch people of French descent
Living people
Olympic cyclists of the Netherlands
People from Kapellen, Belgium
UCI Cyclo-cross World Champions (men)
UCI Road World Championships cyclists for the Netherlands
Tour de Suisse stage winners
Cyclists from Antwerp Province
Overturned convictions in Australia
People acquitted of assault